Vince Kidd was a finalist on series one of the Voice UK. He is now releasing music under the name billy blond.

Appearing on the second of four audition shows, Kidd auditioned with "Like a Virgin", originally by Madonna—with all four coaches electing for him to join their teams; from which Kidd selected Jessie J. During the battle rounds, Kidd sang "We Found Love" by Calvin Harris & Rihanna against seventeen-year-old Jessica Hammond—with Jessie crowning him the winner. In the second live show, Kidd performed Elvis Presley's rendition of "Always on My Mind"—proceeding to the next round on account of the public vote. In the fourth live show, Kidd performed Whitney Houston's "My Love Is Your Love"—proceeding once again to the next round on account of the public vote. In the semi-finals, Kidd performed "Back to Black" by Amy Winehouse—advancing to the fcekidd"/> In the final of The Voice UK, Kidd performed both "Many Rivers to Cross" and "Nobody's Perfect"—the latter alongside coach Jessie J—ultimately finishing in fourth place.

Following The Voice UK, an eight-track compilation was released in June 2012 featuring Kidd's renditions of "Like a Virgin" and "Always On My Mind"; entering the UK chart at number ninety-seven and one-hundred-and-thirty-four respectively. Vince released his debut extended play—Sick Love—in the United Kingdom on 4 November 2012; which peaked at number one-hundred-and-ninety-eight on the UK chart.

A music video for his second EP, The Zoo, featuring The Saturdays' Vanessa White, was uploaded to YouTube on 20 April 2013. The EP was released on 2 June 2012.

"You And Me" was released as a single on iTunes on 7 June 2013. "My Gang" was released as a single on 11 September 2013. In May 2014, he lent his vocals to Alpines song, "Zero", featured on their debut album. He also co-wrote the song.

He featured on the Hollaphonic song "Dangerous", released on 9 February 2015. The song reached No. 1 in Qatar.

A song he co-wrote, "What Would Dusty Do?", was recorded by X Factor 2014 finalist Andrea Faustini, and released on his debut album on 17 July 2015.

Discography

Singles

As lead artist

As featured artist

Guest appearances

References

English male singers
English pop singers
British contemporary R&B singers
English soul singers
British LGBT singers
Singers from London
The Voice UK contestants
The X Factor (British TV series) contestants
Living people
1989 births
21st-century English singers
21st-century British male singers